Sisautiya सिसौटिया (or sometimes Sisotiya) is a small and most populated village in the southernmost part of Nepal commonly known as Madhesh or Terai. Sisautiya is 9 km north of the Indian border, 18 km south from Brahathawa municipality 9 km west from district headquarters Malangawa. It is located at 26°52'0N 85°34'0E with an altitude of 79 metres(262 feet) There is a customs checkpoint at the border crossing. It is part of the Sarlahi district and Province No. 2. It forms the main part of the Sisautiya village development committee. At the time of the 2011 Nepal census it had a population of 13,729 people living in 2259 individual households.

Etymology

Demographics
At the time of the 2011 Nepal census it had a population of 13,729 people residing in 2,259 individual households. People here lives are Madhesi (Mandal, jha, yadav, Patel, Raut,Thakur,Shah,Chaudhary,Ram,Baitha,Mahato) and few Phadi.

Geographical

It is situated in the  Terai Region of Sarlahi district and Zone Janakpur. It is situated 35 km south from Mahendra Highway Nayaroad.
There are 4 parliamentary constituenciesparliamentary constituencies and 8 sub- in Sarlahi. Sisautiya is in area 4(A).

Borders
     North – Belhi VDC
     North - Dhangadha VDC
     South – Godeta VDC
     South–  Bagdaha VDC and Ramban VDC
      East - Sundarpur VDC and Laxmipur Su. VDC 
      West – Dhanakaul Purba VDC
      West – Sikhauna VDC<ref>

Education
There are various institutions in order to provide quality education.
 shree narayan hari secondary school sisautiya-10
 Shree V.K.J Primary School, Sisautiya-01
 Bright Future English Boarding School,Sisautiya-06
 Terai Education English Boarding School,Sisautiya-08
 Shree Janta Primary School, Sisautiya-09

Media 
The major daily newspapers are:
Madhesh Post
Loktantrik
Sarlahi Times

Cinema and Theatre
There is no any cinema and theatre.

2015 Earthquake Nepal
Sisautiya shook during an earthquake on 12 May 2015. However, the VDC did suffer few damage.

Transport

Road: Sisautiya is roughly 198 km by road from Kathmandu. It is also well connected to other parts of the district by Bus Services.

Famous Person
Prajwal Mandal
 Dashi Mukhiya ji (elected in local level election of 2058 BS)
 Jay Naryan Raut (Mukhiya elected in local level election of 2058 BS)
 Vikhari Raut (Shachiv)
 Bishwanath Pandit (Doctor)
 Shyam Babu Shah (Delar)
 Krishana Patel
 Baskit Kumar
 Bhupendra Kumar Mandal  ( Specialization in Computer Engineering )

References

External links
UN map of the municipalities of Sarlahi  District

Populated places in Sarlahi District